Ohridiidae is a family of nematodes belonging to the order Leptolaimida.

Genera:
 Domorganus Goodey, 1946

References

Nematodes